Jesús Herrada López (born 26 July 1990) is a Spanish professional cyclist, who currently rides for UCI WorldTeam .

Career
He was considered one of the most promising young talents in Spanish cycling, having won the National Junior Time Trial Championships in 2007 and 2008, the Under-23 National Time Trial Championships in 2010, and the Spanish National Road Race Championships in 2013. He has the key statistics of 15 wins with 9 Grand tours and 18 classics.

On 3 May 2015, Herrada won the second and last stage of the Vuelta a Asturias. He did so while helping his leader Igor Antón to a general classification victory. He finished fourth in the men's road race at the 2015 European Games in Baku, after giving a lead-out to the winner Luis León Sánchez. In June 2015, he won a bronze medal at the Spanish National Time Trial Championships and a bronze medal in the Spanish National Road Race Championships.

Major results
Source: 

2007
 1st  Time trial, National Junior Road Championships
2008
 1st  Time trial, National Junior Road Championships
2010
 1st  Time trial, National Under-23 Road Championships
 6th Time trial, UEC European Under-23 Road Championships
 8th Time trial, UCI Under-23 Road World Championships
2011
 3rd Road race, National Road Championships
 5th Overall Vuelta a la Comunidad de Madrid
2012
 1st Stage 2a Vuelta a Asturias
2013
 1st  Road race, National Road Championships
 2nd Overall Tour du Poitou-Charentes
1st  Young rider classification
1st  Sprints classification
1st Stage 5
 5th Prueba Villafranca de Ordizia
2014
 1st Stage 1 Route du Sud
 9th Overall Circuit de la Sarthe
 9th Overall Tour de Romandie
1st  Young rider classification
 9th Overall Tour du Poitou-Charentes
1st  Young rider classification
1st Stage 5
2015
 2nd Overall Tour du Limousin
1st Stage 2
 National Road Championships
3rd Road race
3rd Time trial
 3rd Overall Vuelta a Asturias
1st  Points classification
1st Stage 2
 European Games
4th Road race
9th Time trial
 5th Vuelta a La Rioja
 8th Overall Vuelta a Burgos
2016
 1st Stage 2 Critérium du Dauphiné
 2nd Overall Tour du Haut Var
 2nd Overall Vuelta a la Comunidad de Madrid
 8th Overall Volta a la Comunitat Valenciana
2017
 National Road Championships
1st  Road race
3rd Time trial
 2nd Grand Prix Cycliste de Montréal
 9th Overall Tour de Romandie
 10th Klasika Primavera
2018
 4th Road race, UEC European Road Championships
 4th Overall Tour of Oman
 4th Grand Prix La Marseillaise
 5th Overall Volta a la Comunitat Valenciana
 6th Grand Prix de Plumelec-Morbihan
 8th Boucles de l'Aulne
 Vuelta a España
Held  after Stages 12–13
 Combativity award Stage 20
2019
 1st  Overall Tour de Luxembourg
1st  Points classification
1st Stages 3 & 4
 1st Mont Ventoux Dénivelé Challenge
 1st Trofeo Campos, Porreres, Felanitx, Ses Salines
 Vuelta a España
1st Stage 6
 Combativity award Stage 6
 2nd Grand Prix de Plumelec-Morbihan
 3rd Road race, National Road Championships
 3rd Overall Tour of Oman
 5th Trofeo Andratx–Lloseta
 6th Overall Volta a la Comunitat Valenciana
2020
 4th Grand Prix La Marseillaise
 9th Overall Tour de la Provence
 9th Overall Tour de l'Ain
 9th Mont Ventoux Dénivelé Challenge
2021
 1st Trofeo Serra de Tramuntana
 2nd Road race, National Road Championships
 2nd Overall Route d'Occitanie
 4th Trofeo Andratx – Mirador d'Es Colomer
 8th Overall Tour de Luxembourg
 8th GP Miguel Induráin
 9th Overall Tour de la Provence
2022
 1st Classic Grand Besançon Doubs
 Vuelta a España
1st Stage 7
 Combativity award Stage 7
 2nd Road race, National Road Championships
 2nd Tour du Jura
 2nd Boucles de l'Aulne
 3rd Overall Route d'Occitanie
 4th Tour du Finistère
 4th Mercan'Tour Classic
 7th Circuito de Getxo
 9th Overall O Gran Camiño
 9th Tre Valli Varesine
2023
 2nd Overall O Gran Camiño
 7th Overall Tour of Oman
1st Stage 2

Grand Tour general classification results timeline

References

External links

 
 
 
 
 
 
 
 

1990 births
Living people
Spanish male cyclists
Spanish Vuelta a España stage winners
European Games competitors for Spain
Cyclists at the 2015 European Games
Olympic cyclists of Spain
Cyclists at the 2020 Summer Olympics
Cyclists from Castilla-La Mancha
Sportspeople from the Province of Cuenca